Uneeda may refer to:
Uneeda, a Nabisco cracker (1898–2009)
Uneeda Doll Company, purveyors of Dollikins and of Wish-nik troll dolls knockoffs
Uneeda Comix, a 1970 work by Robert Crumb
Uneeda, West Virginia
Uneeda, Ontario, a community of Mississippi Mills, Ontario